Royal Air Force Southrop or more simply RAF Southrop is a former Royal Air Force satellite station west of the village of Southrop, Gloucestershire during the Second World War from August 1940 to November 1945. 

It had three grass runways, It was used as a Relief Landing Ground for Airspeed Oxford and Harvard training aircraft for No. 23 Group RAF.

The defences included a double pillbox.

The following units were here at some point:
 No. 2 (Pilots) Advanced Flying Unit RAF
 No. 2 Service Flying Training School RAF
 No. 3 (Pilots) Advanced Flying Unit RAF
 No. 6 Service Flying Training School RAF
 No. 27 Group Communication Flight RAF
 No. 27 (Signals Training) Group RAF
 No. 1539 (Beam Approach Training) Flight RAF

Current use
The site is currently farmland.

References

External links
fotopic gallery

Royal Air Force stations in Gloucestershire